Wiesław Gąsiorek (13 January 1936 – 4 February 2002) was a professional tennis player from Poland. He competed in the Davis Cup a number of times, from 1959 to 1972.

References 

1936 births
2002 deaths
Polish male tennis players
Sportspeople from Poznań